Lauta (Sorbian: Łuty) is a town in the district of Bautzen, in Saxony, Germany. It is situated 10 km west of Hoyerswerda, and 10 km southeast of Senftenberg.

History
From 1815 to 1945, within the Prussian Province of Brandenburg, Lauta was part of Landkreis Calau. From 1945 to 1952, it was part of Brandenburg. From 1952 to 1990,  within the East German Bezirk Cottbus, it was part of Kreis Hoyerswerda. With German reunification in 1990, it became part of Saxony.

Personality

Personalities who worked in Lauta 
 Albert Zimmermann, resistance fighter, executed on 27 November 1944

Personalities who lived temporarily in Lauta 
 Peter Mädler, (1943–1963), death at the Berlin Wall (1963), 1958–1961 electrician apprentice in the power plant Lauta.
 Joachim Hansen, (1930–2007), actor

References 

West Lusatia
Populated places in Bautzen (district)